Scipio Township is a civil township of Hillsdale County in the U.S. state of Michigan.  The population was 1,902 at the 2020 census.

Communities
The FIPS place code is 55680. The commununity is at the headwaters of the Kalamazoo River.
Mosherville Station is an unincorporated community about a mile east of Mosherville. At one time, the NYC/LSMS railroad had a station there. The railroad line, now defunct, ran from Bankers (southwest of Hillsdale) northeast to Jackson.

Geography

Major highways
 enters briefly in the southeast corner of the township.
 enters briefly in the southwest corner of the township.

Demographics
As of the census of 2000, there were 1,822 people, 619 households, and 487 families residing in the township. There were 660 housing units at an average density of 22.5 per square mile (8.7/km). The racial makeup of the township was 97.37% White, 0.22% African American, 0.77% Native American, 0.55% Asian, 0.22% from other races, and 0.88% from two or more races. Hispanic or Latino of any race were 0.55% of the population.

There were 619 households, out of which 37.5% had children under the age of 18 living with them, 64.8% were married couples living together, 9.5% had a female householder with no husband present, and 21.2% were non-families. 16.8% of all households were made up of individuals, and 5.0% had someone living alone who was 65 years of age or older.  The average household size was 2.93 and the average family size was 3.26.

In the township the population was spread out, with 30.6% under the age of 18, 8.3% from 18 to 24, 28.3% from 25 to 44, 23.5% from 45 to 64, and 9.2% who were 65 years of age or older.  The median age was 34 years. For every 100 females, there were 101.1 males.  For every 100 females age 18 and over, there were 99.4 males.

The median income for a household in the township was $42,361, and the median income for a family was $47,065. Males had a median income of $32,008 versus $23,850 for females. The per capita income for the township was $17,427.  About 6.3% of families and 8.6% of the population were below the poverty line, including 9.9% of those under age 18 and 15.3% of those age 65 or over.

Education
The township is served by two separate public school district.  The majority of the township is served by Jonesville Community Schools to the south in Jonesville.  A small portion of the northwest corner of the township is served by Litchfield Community Schools to the west in Litchfield.

Images

References

External links
 Scipio Township official website

Townships in Hillsdale County, Michigan
Townships in Michigan
Populated places established in 1836
1836 establishments in Michigan Territory